Mountain Institute Joint Technological Education District is a school district in Yavapai County, Arizona, founded in 2008 with classes starting in the fall of 2009. It offers vocational and technical education programs to seven member school districts.

School district members
Ash Fork Joint Unified School District
Bagdad Unified School District
Chino Valley Unified School District
Humboldt Unified School District
Mayer Unified School District
Prescott Unified School District
Seligman Unified School District

References

External links
 

School districts in Yavapai County, Arizona
2008 establishments in Arizona
School districts established in 2008